Alessandro Riolo (born 16 November 1978 in Crotone, Italy) is an Italian footballer who played as an offensive midfielder for Italian Promozione teams A.S. Cutro, Rende Calcio, Cisco Roma and U.S. Vibonese Calcio.

References

External links

Alessandro Riolo's profile on Cisco Roma's official website 

1978 births
Living people
People from Crotone
Italian footballers
Atletico Roma F.C. players
U.S. Vibonese Calcio players
Association football midfielders
Footballers from Calabria
Sportspeople from the Province of Crotone